Aqeel Zaila (born 5 November 1994) is a Saudi Arabian football player who plays as a forward .

References

Living people
1994 births
Association football forwards
Saudi Arabian footballers
Al-Fayha FC players
Al-Qadsiah FC players
Damac FC players
Al-Hejaz Club players
Al-Zulfi FC players
Al-Rayyan Club (Saudi Arabia) players
Place of birth missing (living people)
Saudi Professional League players
Saudi First Division League players
Saudi Second Division players
Saudi Fourth Division players